Mark Schiavi (born 1 May 1964)  is an English former footballer who played as a left midfielder for Bournemouth, Northampton Town and Cambridge United in the English Football League.

Football career

Club career
Schiavi started with West Ham United as an apprentice in their youth squad and was a member of the team which won the 1981 Youth Cup before moving on loan to Bournemouth in 1983. Without making a first team appearance for West Ham this loan was made permanent in 1984. Schiavi also played for Northampton Town, Cambridge United and Kettering Town.

For season 2010-11 he took up a coaching role with Boston Town until he left the club in June 2011.

References

1964 births
Living people
West Ham United F.C. players
AFC Bournemouth players
Northampton Town F.C. players
Cambridge United F.C. players
Barnet F.C. players
Kettering Town F.C. players
Enfield F.C. players
Irthlingborough Diamonds F.C. players
Bourne Town F.C. players
English Football League players
Footballers from Greater London
Association football midfielders
English footballers